The 2004–05 season is FC Metalist Kharkiv's 60th season in existence and the club's 1st season after return to the top flight of Ukrainian football. In addition to the domestic league, Metalist Kharkiv participated in that season's edition of the Ukrainian Cup. The season covers the period from 1 July 2004 to 30 June 2005.

Players

First team squad
Squad at end of season

Left club during season

Competitions

Overall record

Vyshcha Liha

League table

Results summary

Results by round

Results

Ukrainian Cup

References

FC Metalist Kharkiv
FC Metalist Kharkiv seasons